Lindon may refer to:

Places
 Real
Lindon, Colorado
Lindon, Utah
Lindon, South Australia

 Fictional
Lindon (Middle-earth), a region of the extreme west of J.R.R. Tolkien's fictional Middle-earth

Other uses
Lindon (name)

See also
Linden (disambiguation)
Lyndon (disambiguation)
Lynden (disambiguation)